Kyeintali is a town located in Gwa Township of Rakhine State, Myanmar (Burma).

Local area
The area in and around Kyeintali contains beaches, plains and mountains. Markets are also present in many places. The area is mainly populated by the Rakhine people.

Kyeintali is a 40 km bus or taxi ride south of Ngapali Beach, or a long bus ride from Yangon.

Natural resources
Macrognathus pavo
A species included in The IUCN Red List of Threatened Species, Macrognathus pavo  ,is only known from Kyeintali Chaung (stream) in the Rakhine Yoma, Myanmar. It only known from the headwaters of the type locality stream, and is likely restricted to that basin. Macrognathus pavo was described in 2010 and further information is required on the species habitat and ecology, as well as population and distribution. It is currently assessed as Data Deficient.

Kyeintali River Bridge

Jan. 1: The K 58.7 million Kyeintali River Bridge on the Thandwe-Gwa Road in Rakhine State was inaugurated by Minister for Progress of Border Areas and National Races and Development Affairs Lt-Gen. Maung Thint and SLORC Secretary-1 Lt-Gen. Khin Nyunt. (NLM 1/2)

References

External links
 Google Map
 Bin Map

Populated places in Rakhine State